Árpád Orbán (14 March 1938 – 26 April 2008) was a Hungarian Olympic champion football player.

Career
Orbán, born in Győr, Győr-Moson-Sopron, Hungary, was Hungarian. He was Jewish.

He played for Győri ETO FC, Győr, in Hungary. He won a gold medal in football as part of the Hungarian football team at the 1964 Summer Olympics in Tokyo.

See also
List of select Jewish football (association; soccer) players

References

1938 births
2008 deaths
Hungarian footballers
Olympic footballers of Hungary
Olympic gold medalists for Hungary
Olympic medalists in football
Footballers at the 1964 Summer Olympics
Medalists at the 1964 Summer Olympics
Sportspeople from Győr
Győri ETO FC players
Association football defenders
Hungarian Jews
Jewish footballers